Elisha Cutler, Jr. (August 5, 1816 – July 17, 1849) was an American politician.

Born in Boston, Massachusetts, Cutler settled in Van Buren County, Iowa Territory. He served in the first Iowa Constitutional Convention of 1844 and as district court clerk for Van Buren County. From 1846 to 1848, Cutler served as the first Iowa Secretary of State and was a Democrat. Cutler died in Keosauqua, Iowa from cholera.

Notes

1816 births
1849 deaths
Politicians from Boston
People from Van Buren County, Iowa
Secretaries of State of Iowa
Iowa Democrats